Autocharis fessalis is a moth in the family Crambidae. It was described by Charles Swinhoe in 1886. It is found in the Democratic Republic of the Congo, on the Seychelles and in South Africa, the United Arab Emirates, Yemen, Bhutan, India and Pakistan.

References

Moths described in 1886
Odontiinae
Moths of Africa
Moths of Asia